Jianguodao Station, literally Jianguo Road Station in English, is a station of Line 2 of the Tianjin Metro. It started operations on 28 August 2013.

References

Railway stations in Tianjin
Railway stations in China opened in 2013
Tianjin Metro stations